The 1987 Rye Brook Open was a men's tennis tournament played on outdoor hard courts that was part of the 1987 Nabisco Grand Prix. It was played at Rye Brook, New York in the United States from August 24 through August 31, 1987. Unseeded Peter Lundgren won the singles title.

Finals

Singles

 Peter Lundgren defeated  John Ross 6–7, 7–5, 6–3
 It was Lundgren's 1st singles title of the year and the 2nd of his career.

Doubles

 Lloyd Bourne /  Jeff Klaparda defeated  Carl Limberger /  Mark Woodforde 6–3, 6–3
 It was Bourne's only title of the year and the 1st of his career. It was Klaparda's only title of the year and the 1st of his career.

References

External links
 ITF tournament edition details

 
Rye Brook Open
Rye Brook Open